Brentiscerus putoni is a species of dirt-colored seed bug in the family Rhyparochromidae, found in Oceania. It feeds on Eucalyptus seeds.

References

External links

 

Rhyparochromidae
Insects described in 1878
Hemiptera of Oceania